The men's freestyle 120 kilograms is a competition featured at the 2002 World Wrestling Championships, and was held at the Azadi Indoor Stadium in Tehran, Iran from 6 to 7 September 2002.

Results

Preliminary round

Pool 1

Pool 2

Pool 3

Pool 4

Pool 5

Pool 6

Pool 7

Pool 8

Knockout round

References

Men's freestyle 99 kg